is the third studio album (a mini-album) by the Japanese girl group Berryz Kobo. It was released in Japan on July 5, 2006. It's the group's third studio album (although this is a mini album), fourth non-single release, and fifteenth audio release overall.

3 Natsu Natsu Mini Berryz is a concept album with a summer theme. It is also Berryz' second seasonal-themed release (Their previous EP, Special! Best Mini: 2.5 Maime no Kare, featured a winter theme in its artwork but no winter-related songs) and features their previous single "Jiriri Kiteru" along with five tracks exclusive to the EP.

The EP is equally notable to Berryz fans for featuring separate members, or clusters of members, covering summer-related Hello! Project songs by Aya Matsuura, Coconuts Musume, and 3nin Matsuri.

The album debuted at number 20 in the Oricon Weekly Single Chart, remaining in the list for 3 weeks.

Track listing
 
  "It's so summer-like"
  "Summer Remembers You"
 
Vocals: Risako Sugaya. Cover version of a song originally recorded and released by Aya Matsuura.
  "Kiss! Summer Party"
Vocals by Yurina Kumai, Miyabi Natsuyaki and Chinami Tokunaga. Cover version of a song originally recorded and released by 3nin Matsuri (Ai Kago, Rika Ishikawa and Aya Matsuura)
 
Vocals by Saki Shimizu, Maasa Sudo and Momoko Tsugunaga. Cover version of a song originally recorded and released by Coconuts Musume.

Personnel
Saki Shimizu – vocals and band captain
Momoko Tsugunaga – vocals
Chinami Tokunaga – vocals
Miyabi Natsuyaki – vocals
Maasa Sudou – vocals
Yurina Kumai – vocals
Risako Sugaya – vocals
Koichi Yuasa – keyboard and MIDI programming, guitar
Hiroshi Shibasaki – guitar
Yukari Hashimoto – keyboard and MIDI programming
Masato Ishinari – guitar
Hiroshi Iida – percussion
Hideyuki "Daichi" Suzuki – keyboard and MIDI programming, guitar
Jun Yamazaki – keyboard and MIDI programming
Shochiro Hirata – keyboard and MIDI programming
Tsunku – backing vocals, songwriter
Atsuko Inaba – backing vocals
Hiroaki Takeuchi – backing vocals

Production
Nobatsu Umemoto – recording coordination
Asuka Ishikiri – production assistant
Kazumi Matsui – recording and mix engineer
Ryo Wakizaka – recording and mix engineer
Takeshi Yanagisawa – mix engineer
Shinnoskue Kobayashi – mix engineer
Yuichi Ohtsubo – 2nd engineer
Hirofumi Kiraki – 2nd engineer
Youhei Koriuchi – 2nd engineer
Mitsuo Koike – mastering engineer

Charts

References

Berryz Kobo albums
2006 EPs
Piccolo Town-King Records EPs